Pasquale Gravina (born 1 May 1970 in Campobasso, Molise) is a manager and a former Italian professional volleyball player.

Athlete

Gravina is 201 cm and played as middle attacker. After some experiences for minor leagues, he made his debut in the Italian volleyball championship first division in 1988, for Falconara. His qualities, especially in block actions, made him a choice for a top team: Maxicono Parma in 1990. In this club he won the scudetto in 1992 and 1993. Later he played from 1996 until 2001 for Sisley Volley where he won the national title three times more. Then he played for Lube Volley in which he won the Champions League in 2002 and the Italian Cup in 2003. After one year playing for Cuneo, he returned in 2005 to Sisley Volley where he won the last Italian title and Cup before his retiring. He achieved a total of 20 titles.

Gravina played 284 times for the Italian National Team, for which he made his debut in 1990 at San Diego against the US Team. He won gold medal in 1994 and 1998 at Volleyball World Championship, and gold medal in 1993, 1995 and 1999 at Volleyball European Championship, plus four Volleyball World League and several other prestigious victories for a total of 13 titles. He was silver medal at 1996 Summer Olympics and bronze medal at 2000 Sydney Olympics.

Sports Manager

When in 2005 Gravina has stopped the activity as an athlete, he began to play the role of sports agent who served until 2009. At the same time, he also began working with several companies, developing training courses and presentations using the sporting experience translated into business dynamics and founding his personal website pasqualegravina.com.

He became in April 2009 the General Manager of Sisley Treviso and, after one year, he became CEO. In 2012, the last year before the step back from the ownership of the club the Benetton Group, he won the European CEV Cup.

He became in 2012 President of the Volley Treviso, a club that has inherited the titles of dissolved Sisley Volley providing for youth education and training.

Manager

In September 2015 he decided for a new challenge in a different field of work and, until the end of 2016, is the CEO of Trenkwalder Training, a company belonging to the Trenkwalder Group, which plans, organizes and executes individual, sectorial and company training sessions.

Today is Strategic Selling Director of Gi Group, one of the world's leading companies providing services for the development of the labour market.

Clubs

Wins

Club
 6 Italian Championships (1992, 1993, 1998, 1999, 2001, 2005)
 4 Italian Cups (1992, 2000, 2003, 2005)
 3 European Champions League (1999, 2000, 2001)
 4 Cev Cups (1992, 1995, 1998, 2012)
 3 Italian Supercup (1998, 2000, 2004)
 1 European Supercup (1999)
 1 Italian beach volleyball Championship (1992)

National team
 2 World Championships (1994, 1998)
 3 European Championships (1993, 1995, 1999)
 4 World League (1994, 1995, 1997, 2000)
 1 Grand Champions Cup (1993)
 1 World Super Four (1994)
 1 World Super Six (1996)
 1 World Cup (1995)

Olympics

 1 Silver Atlanta 1996
 1 Bronze Sidney 2000

External links
  Nomi celebri – Pasquale Gravina

1970 births
Living people
People from Campobasso
Italian men's volleyball players
Olympic volleyball players of Italy
Olympic silver medalists for Italy
Olympic bronze medalists for Italy
Volleyball players at the 1996 Summer Olympics
Volleyball players at the 2000 Summer Olympics
Olympic medalists in volleyball
Medalists at the 2000 Summer Olympics
Medalists at the 1996 Summer Olympics
Sportspeople from the Province of Campobasso